Cineplex Odeon Corporation was one of North America's largest movie theatre operators and live theatre, with theatres in its home country of Canada and the United States. The Cineplex Odeon brand is still being used by Cineplex Entertainment at some theatres that were once owned by the Cineplex Odeon Corporation, with newer theatres using the Cineplex Cinemas brand. The company was the result of Cineplex Corporation in 1984 purchasing and merging with Canadian Odeon Theatres, which itself was the result of a merger between Canadian Theatres and Odeon Theatres of Canada in 1978.

Theatres formerly operated by the company are now operated by Cineplex Entertainment in Canada and as AMC Theatres in the United States.

History

Odeon Theatres of Canada

The oldest ancestor of Cineplex Odeon was Odeon Theatres of Canada, started as "Generals Theatre Corporation" by Paul Nathanson, son of Famous Players Canadian Corporation president Nathan L. Nathanson. The "Odeon Theatres of Canada" name was first used in January 1941. The elder Nathanson was rumoured to be involved in the chain, but it was not until early May 1941 that he resigned (for the second time) from Famous Players Canadian, and acknowledged his position in creating and operating Odeon. The chain, initially composed of independent theatres, was not originally affiliated with the British "Odeon Cinemas" circuit; it was sold to the British chain's owners, the Rank Organisation, in 1946.  Following World War II, there was a wave of anglophilia in Ontario; Odeon emphasised its British ownership to capitalize on this sentiment, screening British films—particularly those made by Rank.

Odeon Theatres of Canada merged with the Canadian Theatres chain in 1978, becoming known as Canadian Odeon Theatres.

Acquisition by Cineplex Corporation
Cineplex Corporation began operating in 1979. On April 19, 1979, Nathan "Nat" Taylor, inventor of the multiscreen theater, and Garth Drabinsky opened the first Cineplex location, an 18-screen complex in the basement of the Toronto Eaton Centre.  At the time, the theatre earned a place in the Guinness Book of World Records as the world's largest cinema. In July 1982 they opened their first theater in the United States, with a 14-screen multiplex in the newly built Beverly Center in Los Angeles, the largest in the US at the time. Also in 1982, the company listed on the Toronto Stock Exchange.

After successfully winning a legal challenge against the Famous Players/Canadian Odeon duopoly and their exclusive contracts with major studios, in June 1984, Cineplex bought Canadian Odeon Theatres who owned 164 theaters with 297 screens for $12 million, to become Cineplex Odeon. The Bronfman family was a major investor in the purchase.

Expansion
In November 1985, Cineplex Odeon bought the Plitt Theatres chain (previously United Paramount Theatres and ABC Theatres) consisting of over 600 screens, for $135 million. In 1986, Cineplex Odeon bought Essaness Theatres (a Chicago area chain founded in 1929 by Edwin Silverman and Sidney Spiegel of the Spiegel catalog family) consisting of 41 screens for $14.35 million; Neighborhood Theatres of Virginia (75 screens) for $21 million; RKO Century Theatres chain (previously Century Theatres [a New York area chain] and RKO Stanley Warner Theatres) involving 93 screens in New York and New Jersey for $179 million; and Seattle based Sterling Recreation Organization with 114 screens for $45.5 million. Also, in 1986, when federal regulations had been relaxed, MCA (owners of Universal) purchased a stake in Cineplex Odeon. In 1987, Cineplex acquired the Walter Reade Organization (including 11 screens) for $32.5 million from The Coca-Cola Company. They also listed on the New York Stock Exchange in May 1987. They acquired 20 Circle Theatres in Washington DC and Maryland with 75 screens for $51 million in December 1987.

In 1986, the corporation established a film distribution outlet, Cineplex Odeon Films, and a home video distribution outlet, Cineplex Odeon Home Video (Later Cineplex Odeon Video) replacing Pan-Canadian Video Presentations. It distributed all titles in Canada on MCA's behalf, but the film distribution outlet ceased operation in 1997 and the home video outlet a year later after MCA was renamed as Universal Studios. The company also operated Live Entertainment of Canada, which was established in 1989 after they acquired Pantages Theatre from Famous Players. Livent became an independent company after an internal conflict between Drabinsky and MCA.

Cineplex Odeon had grown to become one of the largest film exhibitors in North America by 1993, with 1,630 screens and operations in 365 locations within North America. At this point, Cineplex Odeon accounted for roughly 8% of box office revenues in North America, competing mostly with Famous Players in the Canadian market. Cineplex Odeon and Famous Players were two dominant forces in the Canadian film industry, with both organizations accounting for roughly two-thirds of the industry's annual revenues. The key to the success of the two organizations was in large part due to their supply chain. Cineplex Odeon had exclusive first-run rights to films made by Columbia and Universal Studios, which allowed them to seize a hefty market share.

Controversy surrounded the practices of both Cineplex Odeon and Famous Players in 1998. The two companies had been accused of operating as a duopoly, and choking off the film supply so smaller theatres could not show the same products.

In April 1998, Cineplex Odeon Theatres merged with New York City-based Loews Theatres (founded in 1904 by Marcus Loew) to form Loews Cineplex Entertainment. Alliance Atlantis purchased Cineplex Odeon Films assets along with its home video division the same year.

Post Loews Cineplex Entertainment
After the merger, the company ceased to exist and was merged into the operations of Loews Cineplex Entertainment. In 1999, Ellis Jacob and Steve Brown, former executives who left Cineplex Odeon Corporation during the ownership change, created Galaxy Entertainment designed to bring big-city entertainment to mid-sized markets across Canada. In 2001, Loews Cineplex Entertainment, the company that merged with Cineplex Odeon, filed for chapter 11 bankruptcy. Lowes Cineplex was later acquired by Onex Corporation and Oaktree Capital Management in 2002. In 2004, Onex decided to sell Loews Cineplex and retain the Canadian operations, merging then with Galaxy to form Cineplex Galaxy Income Fund (now Cineplex Entertainment). At the time of the merger, Cineplex Odeon operated 40 locations in Canada.

Gallery

See also
List of Cineplex Entertainment movie theatres

References

External links
 Cineplex Entertainment LP Website

Loews Cineplex Entertainment
Movie theatre chains in Canada
Movie theatre chains in the United States
Companies based in Toronto
Entertainment companies established in 1979
Companies that filed for Chapter 11 bankruptcy in 2001